
Year 860 (DCCCLX) was a leap year starting on Monday (link will display the full calendar) of the Julian calendar.

Events 
<onlyinclude>

By place

Byzantine Empire 
 June 18 – Byzantine–Rus' War: A fleet of about 200 Rus' vessels sails into the Bosphorus, and starts pillaging the suburbs of Constantinople. The raiders set homes on fire, and drown and kill the citizens. Unable to do anything to repel the invaders, Patriarch Photios I urges his flock to implore the Theotokos to save the Byzantine capital. Having devastated the suburbs, the Rus' Vikings pass into the Sea of Marmara and attack the Isles of the Princes, plundering the local monasteries.

Europe 
 King Charles the Bald gives the order to build fortified bridges across the Seine and Loire Rivers, to protect Paris and the Frankish heartland against Viking raids. He hires the services of Weland, a Viking chieftain based on the Somme, to attack the Seine Vikings at their base on the Isle of Oissel. Weland besieges the Vikings—they offer him a huge bribe (6,000 pounds of silver) to let them escape.
 Summer – The Viking chieftains Hastein and Björn Ironside ravage upstream and move to Italy, sacking Luna (believing it to be Rome). They sail up the River Arno to sack the cities of Pisa and Fiesole (Tuscany).
 Summer – Viking raiders led by Weland sail to England and attack Winchester (the capital of Wessex), which is set ablaze. He spreads inland, but is defeated by West Saxon forces, who deprive him of all he has gained.
 December 20 – King Æthelbald of Wessex dies after a 2½-year reign. He is succeeded by his brother, sub-king Æthelberht of Kent, who becomes sole ruler of Wessex.

Iberian Peninsula 
 Muhammad I, Umayyad emir of Córdoba, invades Pamplona (Pyrenees), and captures Crown Prince Fortún Garcés in Milagro, along with his daughter Onneca Fortúnez, and takes them as hostages to Córdoba.

By topic

Art 
 Lusterware tiles, that decorated the mihrab of the Mosque of Uqba at Kairouan (modern Tunisia), are made (approximate date).

Communication 
 The Japanese alphabet Hiragana becomes more popular in Japan. The phonetic alphabet will be further simplified, and reduced to 51 basic characters (approximate date).

Religion 
 Byzantine missionaries Cyril and Methodius arrive in Khazaria.
 Michael I succeeds Sophronius I, as patriarch of Alexandria.

Births  
 Bertila of Spoleto, queen of Italy (approximate date)
 Donald II, king of Scotland (approximate date)
 Georgios I, king of Makuria (approximate date)
 Ibn Abd Rabbih, Moorish writer and poet (d. 940)
 John X, pope of the Catholic Church (d. 928)
 Ludmila, Bohemian duchess regent and saint (approximate date)
 Odo I, king of the West Frankish Kingdom (or 859)
 Robert I, king of the West Frankish Kingdom (or 866)
 Sancho Garcés I, king of Pamplona (approximate date)
 Sergius III, pope of the Catholic Church (approximate date)
 Tudwal Gloff, Welsh prince (approximate date)
 Vasugupta, Indian writer and philosopher (d. 925)

Deaths 
 December 3 – Abbo, bishop of Auxerre
 December 20 – Æthelbald, king of Wessex
 Al-Abbās ibn Said al-Jawharī, Muslim mathematician 
 'Anbasah ibn Ishaq al-Dabbi, Muslim governor
 Athanasia of Aegina, Byzantine noblewoman 
 Constantine Kontomytes, Byzantine general
 Govindasvāmi, Indian astronomer (approximate date)
 Guy I, duke of Spoleto (approximate date)
 Halfdan the Black, Norwegian nobleman
 Sedulius Scottus, Irish grammarian
 Tunberht, bishop of Lichfield (approximate date)

References